Hug! Pretty Cure is the fifteenth television anime series in Izumi Todo and Bandai's Pretty Cure franchise, produced by Asahi Broadcasting Corporation. The series began airing in Japan on February 4, 2018, succeeding Kirakira PreCure a la Mode in its initial time-slot and was succeeded by Star Twinkle PreCure.

The first ending theme is  performed by Rie Hikisaka, Rina Honnizumi, and Yui Ogura, while the second ending theme is  performed by Hikisaka, Honnizumi, Ogura, Nao Tamura, and Yukari Tamura.


Episode list

See also
Pretty Cure Super Stars! - The second Pretty Cure Stars crossover film, which stars the Hugtto! PreCure.

References

Lists of anime episodes
Pretty Cure episode lists